
Gmina Kraśniczyn is a rural gmina (administrative district) in Krasnystaw County, Lublin Voivodeship, in eastern Poland.

The gmina contains part of the protected area called Skierbieszów Landscape Park.

Villages
Gmina Kraśniczyn contains the villages and settlements of Anielpol, Bończa, Bończa-Kolonia, Brzeziny, Chełmiec, Czajki, Drewniki, Franciszków, Kraśniczyn, Łukaszówka, Majdan Surhowski, Olszanka, Pniaki, Stara Wieś, Surhów, Surhów-Kolonia, Wolica, Wólka Kraśniczyńska, Zalesie and Zastawie.

Neighbouring gminas
Gmina Kraśniczyn is bordered by the gminas of Grabowiec, Izbica, Krasnystaw, Leśniowice, Siennica Różana, Skierbieszów and Wojsławice.

References
Polish official population figures 2006

Krasniczyn
Krasnystaw County